SS LeBaron Russell Briggs was a Liberty ship built in the United States during World War II. She was named after LeBaron Russell Briggs, the first Dean of Men at Harvard College and the president of Radcliffe College.

Construction
LeBaron Russell Briggs was laid down on 29 March 1944, under a Maritime Commission (MARCOM) contract, MC hull 2301, by J.A. Jones Construction, Panama City, Florida; she was sponsored by Mrs. George R. Smith, daughter of James Addison Jones, and launched on 12 May 1944.

History
She was allocated to R.A. Nichol & Company, on 31 May 1944. On 5 March 1948, she was laid up in the National Defense Reserve Fleet, in Wilmington, North Carolina. On 26 September 1957, she was relocated to the National Defense Reserve Fleet, in the Hudson River Group. On 8 December 1961, she was withdrawn from the fleet to be loaded with grain under the "Grain Program 1961". She returned loaded with grain to the fleet on 22 December 1961. On 17 June 1963, she was withdrawn from the fleet to have the grain unloaded, she returned empty on 22 June 1963. On 30 July 1970, she was turned over to the US Navy for use in Operation CHASE (Chase 10).

References

Bibliography

 
 
 
 
 
 

 

Liberty ships
Ships built in Panama City, Florida
1944 ships
Wilmington Reserve Fleet
Hudson River Reserve Fleet
Hudson River Reserve Fleet Grain Program
Military projects of the United States
Maritime incidents in 1970